The London Borough of Havering in East London, England, forms part of Outer London. It has a population of 259,552 inhabitants; the principal town is Romford, while other communities are Hornchurch, Upminster, Collier Row and Rainham. The borough is mainly suburban, with large areas of protected open space. Romford is a major retail and night time entertainment centre, and to the south the borough extends into the London Riverside redevelopment area of the Thames Gateway. The name Havering is a reference to the Royal Liberty of Havering which occupied the area for several centuries. The local authority is Havering London Borough Council. It is the easternmost London borough.

Population

Those areas of development are extensive but rarely intensive. It has, at 4.5%, a below average unemployment rate for Greater London, and one of the lowest crime rates.

Havering has a significantly higher proportion of residents in white ethnic groups than other outer London boroughs (87.7% – 2011 census). The Black African population is the most significant minority ethnic group in Havering (3.2%). The Upminster ward of the borough is the third least ethnically diverse in Greater London, with a Simpson's diversity index of 1.10.

Ethnicity

Religion

The following table shows the religious identity of residents residing in Havering.

Neighbours
Havering is bordered to the south by the London Borough of Bexley by the River Thames, to the west by the London Borough of Redbridge and the London Borough of Barking and Dagenham and to the north and east by Essex.

Industry and commerce
There are over 7,000 businesses based in Havering. Romford is the main commercial hub of the borough with a small district of mainly office development close to the railway station. There is also some industry to the south between Rainham and the River Thames such as Rainham Steel headquarters on the boundary of Elm Park. Light industry elsewhere in the borough has been in decline, with major employers such as the former Star Brewery now closed down. New industrial development is encouraged in the south of the borough has been encouraged by the London Development Agency (now GLA Land and Property), with the opening of the Centre for Engineering and Manufacturing Excellence.

The main retail district is also located in Romford with several interconnected or neighbouring shopping arcades including the Liberty Shopping Centre, the Mercury Mall, and the Brewery. Romford Market is located to the north of Romford and is the largest market within the borough and in the surrounding area. Hornchurch and Upminster are the other main retail centres with extensive high street shopping areas.

Romford has a developed night-time economy with one of the highest concentrations of bars and nightclubs anywhere in Greater London outside the West End with public transport radiating into all parts of the borough.

Havering London Borough Council applied to the Government to allow a 'super-casino' to be built in the south of the borough, however the application was rejected in May 2006.

History
The London Borough of Havering was created in 1965 by the combined former area of the Municipal Borough of Romford and Hornchurch Urban District which had been transferred to Greater London from Essex by the London Government Act 1963. The name originates from the Royal Liberty of Havering which covered broadly, but not exactly the same area, and had been abolished in 1892.

Early history

Modern settlement originated in Anglo-Saxon times when it consisted of Havering Palace and the surrounding lands that belonged to the king. The palace itself is known to have existed since at least the reign of Edward the Confessor when it was one of his primary residences. The area formed a liberty from 1465 which included the parishes of Havering-atte-Bower, Hornchurch and Romford.

The name Havering appears in documents from around the 12th century. The origins of this name have been debated by historians since the Middle Ages when it was linked to the legend of Edward the Confessor and a mystical ring returned to him by Saint John the Apostle. The event being commemorated in stained glass (from about 1407) in a chapel at Romford, that was dedicated to the king.

Settlement

London Underground and fast rail services to central London resulted in considerable residential land use mixed with designated parklands and farmland under the planning policy of the predecessor local authorities and current authority during the 20th century and into the early 21st century.

The development of the borough came in two distinct phases. The first middle class suburban developments were built in the late Victorian and Edwardian period. The garden suburbs of Upminster, Emerson Park and Gidea Park (also known as Romford Garden Suburb) were spurred on by the building of the railway lines through Havering from Liverpool Street and Fenchurch Street in the late 19th century.

In the 1930s the District Line was electrified and extended to Upminster with new stations at Elm Park and Upminster Bridge. Also at this time new industries near the area such as the Ford Motor Company plant at Dagenham caused a new wave of mostly working class developments along the route of the new Underground line. In addition to this, to the north of the borough, the large housing estates of Harold Hill and Collier Row were constructed to deal with the chronic housing shortages and early slum clearance programmes in central London.

Districts

This pattern of the 'garden suburb' with inter- and post-war private housing developments occurred widely across the borough, with small estates of social housing representing a low percentage of housing in any single council ward; six of the 30 electoral wards with fewer than 2% social housing are in the borough: Hylands, Mawneys, Pettits, Hacton and the two wards forming Upminster, Cranham and Upminster Ward. Plans to extend existing developments in much of the borough are blocked as open land is protected as part of the Metropolitan Green Belt. In contrast, the southern part of Havering adjacent to the Thames is within the London Riverside section of the Thames Gateway redevelopment area. New open spaces and large scale house building to provide an entirely new residential community is planned.

The most built-up areas are the traditional garden suburb districts of Hornchurch, Emerson Park, Gidea Park, Harold Wood, Romford and Upminster. These places have developed over the last hundred years to form a large area of continuous urban sprawl with indistinct boundaries.

A 2017 study found that, when comparing low-end rent to low-end earnings, private rented housing in Havering is the most affordable of any London borough.

Named neighbourhoods are the developments of Ardleigh Green, Chase Cross, Collier Row, Elm Park, Harold Hill, Rainham. The borough's exurbs with green buffers of farmland or parkland are:

Havering-atte-Bower
North Ockendon
Noak Hill
Wennington

Transport

Roads
The M25 motorway forms part of the borough boundary to the east with North Ockendon the only settlement to fall outside. The A12 (near Romford) and the A13 (near Rainham) are the main trunk radial routes from central London and are located to the north and south of the borough respectively. The A127 trunk route to Southend begins at Gallows Corner; which also forms the eastern end of the A118 local artery from Stratford. The A124 local artery from Canning Town terminates at Upminster.

Public transport

The District line of the London Underground runs roughly east–west through the middle of the borough and there is an extensive network of London Bus routes, linking all districts to Romford and other places beyond the borough. The London, Tilbury and Southend line (operated by c2c) passes through the borough in two places and the Great Eastern Main Line passes through the north of the borough serving Romford, Gidea Park and Harold Wood. Elizabeth line runs stopping services via the GEML, and Greater Anglia operate non-stop services running straight through these stations. There is also a branch line from Romford to Upminster which is currently operated by London Overground. There are proposals for transport improvements in the south of the borough where the population is expected to rise.

Modernisation of railway transport in Havering
In May 2015, stopping services operated by Abellio Greater Anglia at the time, were replaced by Transport for London's new railway service, TfL Rail. These services ran new Class 345 trains, and occasionally some older Class 315 services. In May of 2022, TfL Rail was rebranded as Elizabeth line, and all Class 315 trains were scrapped.

Travel to work
In March 2011, the main forms of transport that residents used to travel to work were: driving a car or van, 31.8% of all residents aged 16–74; train, 11.9%; underground, metro, light rail, tram, 6.3%; bus, minibus or coach, 5.1%; on foot, 4.1%; work mainly at or from home, 2.4%; passenger in a car or van, 2.1%.

Media 
The local newspaper is the Romford Recorder.

Bedrock Radio  is a charity run community health & Hospital radio station located within the Queen's Hospital in Romford.

The first Hospital Radio Service In Havering began broadcasting in 1964 as Harold Wood Radio.
Today, Bedrock Radio serves the community by broadcasting online and to Queen's, King George & Goodmayes Hospitals and features information about the Hospitals and NHS services, promotes charitable and community organisations and has an extensive local events guide featuring community non-profit events.

Time 107.5 FM is the commercial radio station broadcasting to Havering and surrounding areas and features local news.

Places of interest

The Diver
Brookside Theatre
Langtons
Liberty Shopping Centre
Queen's Theatre
RAF Hornchurch Heritage Centre
Rainham Hall – National Trust house in Rainham
Romford Market
Romford Garden Suburb
Upminster Windmill
Upminster Tithe Barn Museum of Nostalgia

Politics

Havering London Borough Council

Havering elects 54 councillors from 18 wards:

After the 2006 local elections the Conservative Party had a majority on the council with 34 councillors and the second largest party represented was the Havering Residents Association with 13 councillors. The Rainham Independent Residents Association had three councillors, the Labour Party had two councillors and the Liberal Democrats and the BNP had one councillor each.

Between May 2006 and October 2008 were three by-elections. The Residents' Association in St Andrews Ward and the Conservatives in Squirrels Health Ward each retained one seat, the Residents' Association lost South Hornchurch to an independent candidate. One councillor elected as a Conservative has resigned the whip and now sits as an independent. Following his election, the independent in South Hornchurch joined the leader of the Rainham Independent Residents' Association in forming the Independent Local Residents' Group. The other two Rainham Independent Residents' Association members formed the Rainham Residents' Association as a separate entity. In May 2004 Councillor Michael White was elected Leader of the council. In June 2014 Councillor Roger Ramsey was re-elected Leader of the council.

The 2010 local elections took place on 6 May 2010. The outcome was little change: Conservatives having 33 councillors, Havering Residents Group 12, Labour 5 and Independent Residents 4. The BNP lost its incumbent before the election having turned to an Independent Resident who was later elected as such.  Labour increased its membership by three. The Independent Residents, who had split in 2008, regained the seats lost through the split. The Lib Dem Member also lost, to a Residents (ex-Labour) candidate.

In March 2013, UKIP gained its first seat on the authority.  UKIP's Lawrence Webb gained his seat from the Conservatives following the death of veteran Conservative, Cllr. Dennis Bull. In July 2013, thirteen Conservative councillors were reported by the local press, the Romford Recorder, as being deselected by the Romford Conservative Association including council cabinet members, formal complaints were made to Conservative Party Headquarters, and later three Conservative councillors defected to UKIP.  Councillors Sandra Binion, Ted Eden and Fred Osborne joined UKIP citing local and national disillusionment.

London Assembly
Havering forms part of the Havering and Redbridge London Assembly constituency.

UK Parliament
Until 2010 the borough was split between the parliamentary constituencies of Hornchurch, Romford and Upminster with the three constituencies entirely within the borough. At the 2010 United Kingdom general election, the boundaries of these constituencies changed to a new Hornchurch and Upminster constituency and Rainham became part of the new cross-borough Dagenham and Rainham constituency.

Sport and leisure

The London Borough of Havering has several sporting clubs:
 Football
 Romford F.C., a Non-League football club who play at Ship Lane, Aveley.
 A.F.C. Hornchurch, a Non-League football club who play at Hornchurch Stadium
 Ice hockey
 Romford Raiders, an ice hockey team who play at Romford Ice Arena.
 Field hockey
 Havering Hockey Club, who play at Campion school

Twinning
Havering is twinned with:
 Ludwigshafen, Germany
 Hesdin, France

Education 

The Borough is the education authority for the district providing education in a mix of foundation, community and voluntary aided schools. There are also a number of academies.

Havering Adult College provides part-time day, evening and weekend adult education (19+) from sites throughout the borough. Havering Sixth Form College provides sixth form education for pupils of borough schools as well as those who are resident in the borough. Havering College of Further and Higher Education provides part-time and full-time education to students aged 14+.

A 2017 study by Trust for London and the New Policy Institute found that 52% of adults in Havering lack Level 3 Qualifications (A Level equivalent) – the worst level of any London borough. 44% of 19 year olds in Havering also lacked these qualifications – the second worst level in the capital.

Health Care 
The Borough of Havering is serviced by The Barking Havering and Redbridge University Hospitals NHS Trust. 

Provisions of Accident and Emergency from Queens Hospital, Romford. During the 2019/2020 financial year Queens hospital received 309,551 patients into the A&E department.

See also
List of people from Havering

References

External links 

 Council website

 
London boroughs
1965 establishments in the United Kingdom
Local authorities adjoining the River Thames